Junko Yaginuma may refer to
 Junko Yaginuma (figure skater) (born 1973), Japanese figure skater
 Junko Yaginuma (model) (born 1978), Japanese announcer and model